Cherlak (Cherlak) is an urban locality (a work settlement) and the administrative center of Cherlaksky District of Omsk Oblast, Russia, located on the right (eastern) bank of the Irtysh River,  southeast of Omsk. Population:

Economy
The settlement's economy includes various businesses serving the needs of the district, as well as a meat-processing plant.

Transportation

Cherlak sits next to the Omsk–Pavlodar autoroute, which provides the primary way of access to the village. Regular bus and "routed taxi" service connects the village to Omsk.

The railroad station most easily accessible from the village, and also named Cherlak, located  further southeast along the same autoroute, is served by few passenger trains, and is rarely used by the villagers.

See also

References

Urban-type settlements in Omsk Oblast